Saros or Sarus was a city and polis (city-state) of ancient Greece on the island of the same name. It was a member of the Delian League.

Its site is located near modern Palatia.

References

Populated places in the ancient Aegean islands
Former populated places in Greece
Greek city-states
Members of the Delian League